Stibiopalladinite is a mineral containing the chemical elements palladium and antimony. Its chemical formula is Pd5Sb2. It is a silvery white to steel grey opaque mineral crystallizing in the    hexagonal crystal system.

It was first described in 1929 for an occurrence in the Bushveld igneous complex of South Africa.

Bibliography
Emsley, John. Nature's Building Blocks. Oxford, 2001.

References

Antimonide minerals
Palladium minerals
Hexagonal minerals
Minerals in space group 185